Marienlystcentret is a sports complex located in Odense, Denmark. Its main venue is the stadium, which has a capacity of 1,200 and is home to the association football department of BK Marienlyst, which plays in the fourth-tier Denmark Series. The complex also contains an arena where the volleyball team and other sports teams are located.

References

Sports venues in Denmark
Sport in Odense
Buildings and structures in Odense
Association football venues in Europe
Volleyball venues in Denmark
1976 establishments in Denmark
Sports venues completed in 1976
Sports complexes